Cyclopeplus is a genus of beetles in the family Cerambycidae, containing the following species:

 Cyclopeplus batesi Thomson, 1861
 Cyclopeplus castaneus Gounelle, 1906
 Cyclopeplus cyaneus Thomson, 1861
 Cyclopeplus lacordairei Thomson, 1868
 Cyclopeplus peruvianus Tippmann, 1939

References

Anisocerini